Crecora/Manister (Irish: Craobh Chumhra/Mainistir) is a Gaelic Athletic Association club located in the parishes of Crecora and Manister in County Limerick. The club was founded in 1885. The club fields teams in hurling from underage up to Junior A, and in Gaelic football from underage to Intermediate.

Location
The club is situated in the half parish of Crecora and in the parish of Manister in central County Limerick. The parishes are situated roughly 15 km south of Limerick City and are near the larger villages of Patrickswell, Croom and Fedamore. Neighbouring clubs include Mungret St. Paul's, Patrickswell, Croom, Banogue, Camogue Rovers, Fedamore and South Liberties.

History
The club was founded in 1885 and competed in a number of tournaments at that time. In one tournament in Ballyneety, Crecora lost to South Liberties in the final. There was also a recorded match against Liberties in Ballysheedy in 1895. Manister also had its own club during the latter years of the 1800s. The club went in and out of existence over the first half of the 20th century. At times,  players from the parishes played with neighbouring clubs. The modern club was established in 1968 and teams competed at junior level although there was still no underage structure.

The club started to prosper during the late 1990s and early 2000s when several underage division two titles were won at under 14, 16 and minor. Crecora/Manister won the County Junior B Hurling Championship in 2001 with a win over Ballybricken in the final. They reached the semi finals of the County Junior A Hurling Championships in 2007, but thus far haven't challenged for promotion to intermediate level. In 2020 the clubs football team won their first ever Junior A County final defeating Monagea by a scoreline of 1-11 to 0-11, sealing promotion to intermediate level for the first time in the clubs history. Due to the small population of the parishes the club amalgamates with neighbouring clubs such as Fedamore and Croom with some success.

Grounds
Prior to 1988, the club rented out various fields around the parishes from local farmers for training and matches. In 1988, it located a site about half a kilometre from Crecora village in the townland of Skehanagh in Manister parish. It was blessed and officially opened in 1991 and contained a full sized pitch along with a smaller sized training pitch. Dressing rooms were constructed in 1997-98 and soon after nets and lights were added. A hurling wall was also built in 2010-11.

Honours
Hurling
 Limerick CountyJunior B Hurling Championship (1): 2001
 Limerick City Junior A Hurling Championship (3): 2003, 2004, 2005
 Limerick City U21 B Hurling Championship (1): 2003, 2004, 2005, 2018

Football
 Limerick City Junior B Football Championship (1): 2015
 Limerick County Junior A Football Championship (1): 2020

References
 "One Hundred Years of Glory: A History of Limerick GAA", Ó Ceallaigh, Séamus & Murphy, Seán, 1984.

External links
Limerick GAA site

Gaelic games clubs in County Limerick